Robert Jardine may refer to:
Robert Jardine (politician) (1825–1905), Scottish businessman, politician and baronet
Robert Jardine (railway promoter) (1812–1866), Canadian businessman
Bob Jardine (1864–1941), Scottish footballer
Robert Jardine (surgeon) (1862–1932), Nova Scotian and professor of midwifery in Glasgow, Scotland
Robert Anderson Jardine (1878–1950), priest of the Church of England